Jeffrey MacDougall  (16 September 1911 – 11 December 1942) was a British modern pentathlete. He competed at the 1932 and 1936 Summer Olympics. He was killed in action during World War II.

Personal life
MacDougall was commissioned as an officer in the Duke of Cornwall's Light Infantry in 1932, and was seconded to the Royal Air Force as a flying officer on probation four years later. With the outbreak of the Second World War, MacDougall was promoted to flight lieutenant. He was awarded the Distinguished Flying Cross in 1940, for attacking a German airfield with "courage and determination". He flew 22 missions before dying on active service in December 1942. He is buried at Reading Crematorium.

References

External links
 

1911 births
1942 deaths
British male modern pentathletes
Olympic modern pentathletes of Great Britain
Modern pentathletes at the 1932 Summer Olympics
Modern pentathletes at the 1936 Summer Olympics
Sportspeople from Buenos Aires
Royal Air Force personnel killed in World War II
Recipients of the Distinguished Flying Cross (United Kingdom)
Duke of Cornwall's Light Infantry officers
Royal Air Force pilots of World War II
Royal Air Force wing commanders
Argentine emigrants to England